The Laser 4.7 or ILCA 4 is a one-design dinghy class in the Laser series and is a one-design class of sailboat. All Lasers are built to the same specifications. The Laser is 4.06 m (13 ft 10 in) long, with a waterline length of 3.81 m (12 ft 6 in). The hull weight is 59 kg (130 lb). The boat is manufactured by ILCA and World Sailing approved builders.

Lasers are cat-rigged, meaning they have only one sail. The 4.7 uses the same hull and top mast section as the Laser, but has a different bottom mast section as well as a smaller sail. The bottom mast section is already bent which effectively reduces the power of the rig, and the sail is only 4.7 square meters, as opposed to 7 for the Laser Standard or 5.7 for the Laser Radial. The smaller sail means that the 4.7 can be easily sailed by sailors weighing only 50–65 kg (110–145 lb), though this boat can still be sailed competitively under and over the ideal weights.

Description
The Laser 4.7 has been increasing in popularity around the world since the late 1990s. In some areas it is less popular than the Byte dinghy, a very similar class also designed as a youth single-handed racing trainer, but the interchangeability of the rigs of the Laser series has always made them popular. It is popular among youth sailors graduating from the Optimist sailing dinghy, and many 4.7 sailors graduate to the Laser Radial as they progress their sailing abilities.

Events

World Championships

Boys

Girls

See also
Laser (dinghy)
Laser Radial
Laser 4.7 World Championships

References

External links
Manufacturers website
Guide to the various sizes of Laser sailboats